The PSA World Series 2015–16 is a series of men's and women's squash tournaments which are part of the Professional Squash Association (PSA) World Tour for the end of the 2015 and the start of the 2016 squash season. The PSA World Series tournaments are some of the most prestigious events on the men's and women's tour. The best-performing players in the World Series events qualify for the annual 2016 Men's PSA World Series Finals and 2016 Women's PSA World Series Finals tournament. Grégory Gaultier won the men's 2016 PSA World Series against Cameron Pilley and Laura Massaro won the women's 2016 PSA World Series against Raneem El Weleily.

PSA World Series Ranking Points
PSA World Series events also have a separate World Series ranking.  Points for this are calculated on a cumulative basis after each World Series event. The top eight players at the end of the calendar year are then eligible to play in the PSA World Series Finals.

2015–16 Men's PSA World Series

2015–16 Men's Tournaments

Men's World Series Standings 2015–16

Bold – Players qualified for the final

2015–16 Women's PSA World Series

2015–16 Women's Tournaments

Women's World Series Standings 2015–16

Bold – Players qualified for the final

See also
PSA World Tour 2015
PSA World Tour 2016
Official Men's Squash World Ranking
Official Women's Squash World Ranking

References

External links 
 World Series Series Squash website

PSA World Tour seasons
2015 in squash
2016 in squash